Nalanda BCA College Vidyaranya, Gadag Road, Bhadiwad, Hubli, in the Indian state of Karnataka offers a 3 year Bachelor of Computer Application Degree Course. It was  founded in 2008. The college works under the aegis of "Sidhu Vidya Samsthe" a charitable nonprofit educational trust. It was registered under Bombay Trust Act 1951 at Charity Commissioner Office Belgaum on 8 August 2000.

History
"Nalanda" is a Sanskrit word meaning 'Continuous Education Charity'.

Nalanda BCA college was founded in 2008 by shri H.S.Nabhapur chairman Sidhu Vidya Samsthe.

Campus
Spread across over 4 acres, the Campus contains various buildings with old architecture. Its amenities include class rooms, libraries, laboratories and a playground.

Educational Programs
The Bachelor of Computer Applications (BCA) is a three year degree program with an annual enrollment of 50 students. The program is spread over six semesters and affiliated to Karnatak University Dharwad.

References

 

Universities and colleges in Hubli-Dharwad